The 2017–18 UEFA Europa League group stage began on 14 September and ended on 7 December 2017. A total of 48 teams competed in the group stage to decide 24 of the 32 places in the knockout phase of the 2017–18 UEFA Europa League.

Draw
The draw for the group stage was held on 25 August 2017, 13:00 CEST, at the Grimaldi Forum in Monaco.

The 48 teams were drawn into twelve groups of four, with the restriction that teams from the same association could not be drawn against each other. For the draw, the teams were seeded into four pots based on their 2017 UEFA club coefficients.

On 17 July 2014, the UEFA emergency panel ruled that Ukrainian and Russian clubs would not be drawn against each other "until further notice" due to the political unrest between the countries.

Moreover, the draw was controlled for teams from the same association in order to split the teams evenly into the two sets of four groups (A–F, G–L) for maximum television coverage. On each matchday, one set of six groups played their matches at 19:00 CEST/CET, while the other set of six groups played their matches at 21:05 CEST/CET, with the two sets of groups alternating between each matchday.

The fixtures were decided after the draw, using a computer draw not shown to public, with the following match sequence (Regulations Article 15.02):

Note: Positions for scheduling did not use the seeding pots, e.g., Team 1 was not necessarily the team from Pot 1 in the draw.

There were certain scheduling restrictions: for example, teams from the same city in general were not scheduled to play at home on the same matchday (to avoid teams from the same city playing at home on the same day, due to logistics and crowd control), and teams in certain countries (e.g., Russia) were not scheduled to play at home on the last matchday (due to cold weather and simultaneous kick-off times).

Teams
Below were the participating teams (with their 2017 UEFA club coefficients), grouped by their seeding pot. They included 16 teams which entered in this stage, the 22 winners of the play-off round, and the 10 losers of the Champions League play-off round (5 in Champions Route, 5 in League Route).

Notes

Format
In each group, teams played against each other home-and-away in a round-robin format. The group winners and runners-up advanced to the round of 32, where they were joined by the eight third-placed teams of the Champions League group stage.

Tiebreakers

Teams were ranked according to points (3 points for a win, 1 point for a draw, 0 points for a loss), and if tied on points, the following tiebreaking criteria were applied, in the order given, to determine the rankings (Regulations Articles 16.01):
Points in head-to-head matches among tied teams;
Goal difference in head-to-head matches among tied teams;
Goals scored in head-to-head matches among tied teams;
Away goals scored in head-to-head matches among tied teams;
If more than two teams were tied, and after applying all head-to-head criteria above, a subset of teams were still tied, all head-to-head criteria above were reapplied exclusively to this subset of teams;
Goal difference in all group matches;
Goals scored in all group matches;
Away goals scored in all group matches;
Wins in all group matches;
Away wins in all group matches;
Disciplinary points (red card = 3 points, yellow card = 1 point, expulsion for two yellow cards in one match = 3 points);
UEFA club coefficient.

Groups
The matchdays were 14 September, 28 September, 19 October, 2 November, 23 November, and 7 December 2017. The match kickoff times were 19:00 and 21:05 CEST/CET in general, except for certain matches for geographical reasons.

Times up to 28 October 2017 (matchdays 1–3) were CEST (UTC+2), thereafter (matchdays 4–6) times were CET (UTC+1).

Group A

Group B

Group C

Group D

Group E

Group F

Group G

Group H

Group I

Group J

Group K

Group L

Notes

References

External links
UEFA Europa League (official website)
UEFA Europa League history: 2017/18

2
2017-18
September 2017 sports events in Europe
October 2017 sports events in Europe
November 2017 sports events in Europe
December 2017 sports events in Europe